is a passenger railway station in located in the town of Nachikatsuura, Higashimuro District, Wakayama Prefecture, Japan, operated by West Japan Railway Company (JR West).

Lines

Station layout
The station consists of a single side platform serving one bi-directional track. The station is unattended.

Adjacent stations

|-
!colspan=5|West Japan Railway Company (JR West)

History
The Shingu Railway was nationalized on July 1, 1934, at which time the name was changed to its present name. With the privatization of the Japan National Railways (JNR) on April 1, 1987, the station came under the aegis of the West Japan Railway Company.

Passenger statistics
In fiscal 2019, the station was used by an average of 42 passengers daily (boarding passengers only).

Surrounding Area
 Nachi beach
 Nachikatsuura Municipal Nachi Junior High School
 Nachi Tenma Post Office
 Nachikatsuura Town Gymnasium
 Nachikatsuura Town Hot Spring Hospital

See also
List of railway stations in Japan

References

External links

 Kii-Temma Station (West Japan Railway) 

Railway stations in Wakayama Prefecture
Railway stations in Japan opened in 1912
Nachikatsuura